
Gmina Supraśl is an urban-rural gmina (administrative district) in Białystok County, Podlaskie Voivodeship, in north-eastern Poland.

The gmina contains part of the protected area called Knyszyń Forest Landscape Park.

Villages
Apart from the town of Supraśl, Gmina Supraśl contains the villages and settlements of Cegielnia, Ciasne, Cieliczanka, Czołnowo, Drukowszczyzna, Grabówka, Grabówka-Kolonia, Henrykowo, Izoby, Jałówka, Karakule, Komosa, Konne, Kopna Góra, Kozły, Krasne, Krasne-Gajówka, Krasny Las, Krzemienne, Łaźnie, Majówka, Międzyrzecze, Ogrodniczki, Pieczonka, Podjałówka, Podłaźnie, Podsokołda, Podsokołda-Gajówka, Pólko, Sadowy Stok, Sobolewo, Sobolewo-Kolonia, Sokołda, Sowlany, Stary Majdan, Surażkowo, Turo, Turo-Gajówka, Woronicze, Zacisze, Zaścianki, Zdroje and Zielona.

Neighbouring gminas
Gmina Supraśl is bordered by the city of Białystok and by the gminas of Czarna Białostocka, Gródek, Sokółka, Szudziałowo, Wasilków and Zabłudów.

References
Polish official population figures 2006

Suprasl
Białystok County